The Vox Maris ("Sound of the Sea") is an instrument that was built for the Yeosu Expo 2012 in Korea by the German organ building company Hey Orgelbau (de) and was recognized as the acoustic signet of the exposition. It combines elements of the pipe organ and the steam whistle. It is considered an aerophone, since its dynamic high pressure organ pipes are powered by air. It can be played from a wireless tablet-pc.

The construction process was documented by a film team of German Bavarian Television.

On 21 October 2011, Guinness World Records confirmed the Vox Maris as the loudest pipe organ in the world, producing a reading of 138.4 dbA.

In 2015, the RID (Rekord-Institut für Deutschland) corroborated the Vox Maris as the loudest pipe organ.

SpecificationsISO Journal, The Magazine of the International Society of Organbuilders, number 43, pages 46-54 
 organ rank called "Vox Maris" 
 80 dynamic pipes 
 range A - e´´ ´´ ´´
 length of the longest pipe: 10.00 m
 length of the smallest pipe: 1.70 m
 weight of the pipe A: more than 850 kg
 material: stainless steel, copper and brass
 sculpture "Sound Wave":
 height: 72 m
 length: 33 m (wrapped around in S-shape)
 wind supply:
 compressed air system
 performance: (PS, m3/min) 110 kW, 20,000 L/min
 5000 L air tank
 wind pressure in mmWS: 10,000–100,000 mmWS
 console (pipe organ):
 mobile
 1 manual, 80 keys
 pedal, 30 keys
 register knobs
 multiple coupler functions
 touchscreen
 control via Android App
 tracture(pipe organ):
 key action: electric
 stop action: electric
 weight of the organ: c. 23,000 kg

References 

 Guinness World Records 2013, page 197
 The Magazine of the International Society of Organbuilders, ISO Journal, Number 43, pages 46–54

External links 
 

Pipe organ
Yeosu